Singkil is a town in Aceh province of Indonesia and it is the seat (capital) of Aceh Singkil Regency.

Climate
Singkil has a tropical rainforest climate (Af) with heavy to very heavy rainfall year-round.

References

Populated places in Aceh
Regency seats of Aceh